Ronceverte Historic District is a historic district in Ronceverte, West Virginia, United States, that is listed on the National Register of Historic Places.

Description
The district encompasses 215 contributing buildings, one contributing site, and three contributing structures located in the commercial district and surrounding residential section. It includes residential and commercial buildings, along with several churches, a historic train depot and locomotive coaling tower, one historic bridge, and several historic brick-paved streets.  The oldest building is "Edgarton," built about 1832 and heavily remodeled in the 1880s. Other notable buildings are the old Ronceverte City Hall, Episcopal Church of the Incarnation (1886), Trinity Methodist Church (1880s), Grand Theater (1937), and C&O Passenger Depot (1915).

It was listed on the National Register of Historic Places May 6, 2005.

See also

 National Register of Historic Places listings in Greenbrier County, West Virginia

References

External links

 

National Register of Historic Places in Greenbrier County, West Virginia
Houses on the National Register of Historic Places in West Virginia
Commercial buildings on the National Register of Historic Places in West Virginia
Historic districts in Greenbrier County, West Virginia
Houses in Greenbrier County, West Virginia
Historic districts on the National Register of Historic Places in West Virginia